New Axis Airways, known until 2006 as Axis Airways, was an airline based in Marseille, France. It operated domestic and international charter flights and cargo services on behalf of European clients. Its main bases were Marseille Provence Airport and Paris-Charles de Gaulle.

History 
The airline was founded as Sinair in Grenoble. It was sold by Pan European Air Services to Axis Partners in June 2000. It was rebranded as Axis Airways in February 2001 and relocated from Grenoble to Marseille. It filed for bankruptcy in October 2006, before finding funding through a group of investors, including Arkia Israel Airlines. The owners are Etoile de La Valentine (26%), Arkia Israel Airlines (20%), Gamma Travel (13%), ISF (35%) and Sarah Tours (6%). It started operations in December 2006 and has 73 employees. It was renamed into New Axis Airways in 2008.

The airline ceased operations on 7 December 2009.

Services 

New Axis Airways operated services to
Marseille – Marseille Provence Airport Hub
Paris – Charles de Gaulle Airport Hub
Luxor – Luxor Airport
Hurghada – Hurghada Airport
Cairo – Cairo International Airport
Tel Aviv – Ben Gurion International Airport
Faro – Faro Airport
Heraklion – Heraklion International Airport
Eilat – Ovda International Airport

Fleet
The New Axis Airways fleet consisted of the following aircraft (as of December 2009):

1 Boeing 737 400: F-GLXQ
2 Boeing 737-800: F-GIRS, F-GZZA

References

External links

Defunct airlines of France